Franz Malmsten (6 November 1905 Narva – 6 February 1967 Tallinn) was an Estonian actor.

From 1925 to 1937 he worked at the Narva Theatre. From 1937 to 1967 he worked at Estonian Drama Theatre. He participated also on operas and operettas, and he also acted in films.

Awards:
 1964: Estonian SSR merited artist

He was married to actress Eva Meil. His grandchild is the actor Mait Malmsten.

Filmography

 1951: "Valgus Koordis" (feature film; in the role: Janson)
 1956: "Tagahoovis" 
 1957: "Pöördel" 
 1960: "Näitleja Joller" 
 1965: "Külmale maale"
 1965: "Me olime 18-aastased" 
 1970: "Valge laev"

References

1905 births
1967 deaths
Estonian male stage actors
Estonian male film actors
20th-century Estonian male actors
People from Narva
Soviet male actors